Jealousy is an EP by Japanese heavy metal band Loudness. It was released in May 1988 only in Japan, a market that the band felt to have neglected in favour of American audiences. It would also mark the final recording with the classic line-up, until Spiritual Canoe in 2001. Singer Minoru Niihara left the band after the end of the domestic tour promoting this release. The song "Long Distance Love" would later be reworked for the On the Prowl album, with vocals by American singer Mike Vescera.

Track listing
All music by Akira Takasaki, all lyrics by Minoru Niihara

30th Anniversary Edition

Personnel
Loudness
Minoru Niihara - vocals
Akira Takasaki - guitars
Masayoshi Yamashita - bass
Munetaka Higuchi - drums

Additional musicians
Masanori Sasaji - keyboards
Jesus Kogyama, Enky Fujino, Paul Raymond, Frank Dimino - backing vocals

Production
Bill Freesh - engineer
Yasuhiro Ito, Hideaki Kojima - assistant engineers
Toshi Makashita - executive producer

References

1988 EPs
Loudness (band) albums
Atco Records EPs
Japanese-language EPs